This is the list of voivodes of Nizhyn. A Nizhyn voivode was a Muscovite military position in Cossack Hetmanate.

 Ivan Rzhevskiy (1665–1672)
 Stepan Khruscheov (1672–1673)
 Prince Vladimir Volkonskiy (1673–1675)
 Prince Semeon Zvenigorodskiy (1673–1675)
 Avraam Khitrovo (1689–1692)
 Ivan Saveolov Junior (1692–1697)

References 

History of Nizhyn
Lists of office-holders in Ukraine